The 1966 Houston Cougars football team was an American football team that represented the University of Houston as an independent during the 1966 NCAA University Division football season. In its fifth season under head coach Bill Yeoman, the team compiled an 8–2 record, outscored opponents by a total of 335 to 125, and was ranked No. 17 in the final UPI/Coaches Poll.  The team led the NCAA in total offense with an average of 437.2 yards per game.

Halfback Dickie Post was the team captain, led the team with 1,061 rushing yards, and was also selected by the Houston Chronicle as the Player of the Year. Other statistical leaders included quarterback Bo Burris with 1,666 passing yards and split end Ken Hebert with 38 receptions, 800 receiving yards, and 113 points scored (11 touchdowns, 41 extra points, and two field goals). Hebert's 113 points led all major college football players in 1966.

The team played its home games at the Astrodome in Houston. The attendance at seven home games totaled 287,530, an average of 41,076 per game.

Schedule

Records
Houston players set multiple single-season school records during the 1966 season, including the following:
 Burris set school records with 22 touchdown passes and also with 21 interceptions thrown. 
 Hebert set school records with 113 points scored and 11 touchdown receptions. He also punted for an average of 41.33 yards on 40 punts.
 Don Bean set school records with 384 punt return yards (on 19 returns) and also with three punt returns for touchdowns.
 Running back Warren McVea set a school record with an average of 8.8 rushing yards per carry.

The team also set single-game scoring and total offense records with 73 points and 585 yards against Tulsa on November 5.

Roster	
 Tom Beer, tight end
 Royce Berry, defensive end
 Greg Brezina, linebacker
 Bo Burris, quarterback	
 George Caraway, defensive line
 Bill Cloud, offensive tackle
 Carl Cunningham, defensive end/linebacker
 Jim Dyar, defensive line	
 Charlie Fowler, offensive line	
 Jerry Gardner, linebacker
 Dick George, defensive line
 Ken Hebert, split end	
 Gus Hollomon, defensive back
 Warren McVea, running back
 George Nordgren, running back
 Paul Otis, defensive line	
 Tom Paciorek, defensive back
 Johnny Peacock, defensive back
 Wade Phillips, linebacker
 Bill Pickens, offensive guard
 Dickie Post, running back
 Barry Sides, offensive line
 Mike Simpson, defensive back
 Dick Spratt, defensive back
 Skippy Spruill, linebacker	
 Rich Stotter, offensive guard

Professional football
Several players from the 1966 Houston team later played in the NFL or AFL: Tom Beer, Bo Burris, Carl Cunningham, Paul Gipson, Ken Hebert, Greg Brezina, Charlie Hall, Gus Hollomon, Royce Berry, Warren McVea, and Dickie Post. In addition, Tom Paciorek, who intercepted six passes in 1966, went on to play 18 years in Major League Baseball.

References

Houston
Houston Cougars football seasons
Houston Cougars football